Rio das Pedras may refer to:

 Rio das Pedras, Rio de Janeiro, Brazil
 Rio das Pedras, São Paulo, Brazil, a municipality

See also
 Das Pedras River (disambiguation)